McAndrews is an unincorporated community in Pike County, Kentucky, United States. Their post office opened in 1921. It was also known as Pinson.

References

Unincorporated communities in Pike County, Kentucky
Unincorporated communities in Kentucky